Yemma is a genus of stilt bugs in the family Berytidae. There are about five described species in Yemma.

Species
These five species belong to the genus Yemma:
 Yemma exilis Horvath, G., 1905 c g
 Yemma gracilis Linnavuori, R., 1974 c g
 Yemma javanica Blote, H.C., 1945 c g
 Yemma pericarti Stusak, 1984 c g
 Yemma signatus (Hsiao, T.Y., 1974) c g
Data sources: i = ITIS, c = Catalogue of Life, g = GBIF, b = Bugguide.net

References

Further reading

External links

 

Berytidae
Pentatomomorpha genera